Rehemäe is a village in Lääne-Nigula Parish, Lääne County in western Estonia. Prior to the administrative reform of Estonian local governments in March 2017, the village belonged to Nissi Parish.

References

 

Villages in Lääne County